Lieutenant-Colonel Sir Arthur George Ferguson CBE (22 June 1862 – 14 February 1935) was a British Army officer and police officer, who served as His Majesty's Inspector of Constabulary in Scotland.

Family
Ferguson was the eldest son of Lieutenant-Colonel George Arthur Ferguson (1835–1924), the sixth Laird of Pitfour, a large estate in the Buchan area of Aberdeenshire, north east Scotland. His mother was Nina Maria Hood, who was the eldest daughter of Alexander Nelson Hood, 1st Viscount Bridport.

Career and early life

Ferguson was born in Canada while his father was posted overseas, but the family returned to Britain in 1864 and initially lived in London.

He went to Eton College in 1876 and was then commissioned into the Rifle Brigade, in which he served for 22 years. He saw active service in the Second Boer War. He achieved the rank of Major in February 1901 after which, in October that year, he returned to his father's estate at Pitfour. He married Janet Norah Baird (1878-1943), a daughter of Sir Alexander Baird, in London in 1902.

In 1904 he was appointed His Majesty's Inspector of Constabulary for Scotland and served in this role until 1927, although he rejoined the Army during the First World War.

He was appointed Commander of the Order of the British Empire (CBE) in the 1920 civilian war honours and knighted on his retirement in 1927.

He died at the age of 72. His son, Angus Arthur Ferguson (born 1903), also became a police officer, eventually serving as Chief Constable of Northamptonshire from 1931.

Footnotes

References
Obituary, The Times, 15 February 1935

Bibliography

1862 births
1935 deaths
Officers in Scottish police forces
People from Perth and Kinross
Military personnel from London
People educated at Eton College
Rifle Brigade officers
British Army personnel of the Second Boer War
Scottish police officers
Knights Bachelor
Commanders of the Order of the British Empire
British Army personnel of World War I
Chief Inspectors of Constabulary (Scotland)
People from London